Eugene Ansah (born 16 December 1994) is a Ghanaian footballer who plays as a forward for Hapoel Be'er Sheva in the Israeli Premier League.

Club career 
On 21 June 2021, Ansah joined in the Israeli Premier League club Hapoel Be'er Sheva F.C. after having an impressive season with Ironi Kiryat Shmona.

International career
Ansah debuted with the senior Ghana national team in a 3–0 friendly loss to Mali on 9 October 2020.

Honours
Lokeren
Belgian Cup: 2013–14

Hapoel Be'er Sheva
Israel State Cup: 2021–22
Israel Super Cup: 2022

External links

References

Living people
1994 births
Ghanaian footballers
Ghana international footballers
Association football midfielders
K.S.C. Lokeren Oost-Vlaanderen players
Beitar Tel Aviv Bat Yam F.C. players
Hapoel Ra'anana A.F.C. players
Hapoel Ironi Kiryat Shmona F.C. players
Hapoel Be'er Sheva F.C. players
Belgian Pro League players
Liga Leumit players
Israeli Premier League players
Expatriate footballers in Belgium
Expatriate footballers in Israel
Ghanaian expatriate sportspeople in Belgium
Ghanaian expatriate sportspeople in Israel